Albert Oliver Badman (18 December 1885 – 24 April 1977) was an Australian politician. Born in Yacka, South Australia, he was educated at state schools before becoming a wheat farmer and wheat breeder. He was a Methodist lay preacher and President of the South Australian Country Party before entering Parliament. In 1931, he was elected to the Australian Senate for South Australia, representing the Country Party. In 1937, Badman transferred to the House of Representatives, winning the seat of Grey. The United Australia Party (UAP) did not contest the seat as the Country Party had agreed to allow the UAP's sitting member for Grey, Philip McBride, to take Badman's place in the Senate. Together with fellow Country Party members Arthur Fadden, Bernard Corser and Thomas Collins, Badman dissociated himself from party leader Earle Page after the latter made attacks on the leader of the UAP, Robert Menzies; the exclusion of these four led to the election of Page supporter Archie Cameron as the party's next leader. In 1940, Cameron defected to the UAP, and the Country Party in South Australia ceased to exist; Badman became, in effect, a UAP member. He was defeated in 1943, and returned to farming. He was President of the Primary Producers' Union of South Australia from 1954 to 1961. Badman died in 1977.

Family
Albert Oliver Badman was born at Yacka on 18 December 1885 to Robert Badman and Agnes Mary née Duffield. He married Ann White on 15 February 1911 at Yacka, South Australia, Australia and they had four sons: Ronald Hallam Badman (1911–2006), Wesley Oliver Badman (1913–1998), Lancel Collis Badman (1915–2012) and Sankey Roydon Badman (1918–2010).

References

 

National Party of Australia members of the Parliament of Australia
United Australia Party members of the Parliament of Australia
Members of the Australian House of Representatives for Grey
Members of the Australian House of Representatives
Members of the Australian Senate for South Australia
Members of the Australian Senate
1885 births
1977 deaths
20th-century Australian politicians